The 8-track tape (formally Stereo 8; commonly called eight-track cartridge, eight-track tape, and eight-track) is a magnetic tape sound recording technology that was popular from the mid-1960s to the early 1980s, when the compact cassette, which pre-dated the 8-track system, surpassed it in popularity for pre-recorded music. 

The format was commonly used in cars and was most popular in the United States, the United Kingdom, Canada, New Zealand, Australia, Mexico, Spain, France, Germany, Italy, Sweden and Japan. One advantage of the 8-track tape cartridge was that it could play continuously in an endless loop, and did not have to be "flipped over" to play the entire tape. After about 80 minutes of playing time, the tape would start again at the beginning. 

The Stereo 8 Cartridge was created in 1964 by a consortium led by Bill Lear, of Lear Jet Corporation, along with Ampex, Ford Motor Company, General Motors, Motorola, and RCA Victor Records (RCA - Radio Corporation of America). 

The 8-track tape format is now considered obsolete, although there are collectors that refurbish these tapes and players as well as some bands that issue these tapes as a novelty. Cheap Trick's The Latest in 2009 was issued on 8-track, as was Dolly Parton's A Holly Dolly Christmas in 2020, the latter with an exclusive bonus track.
Little Lost Girl Media from Oregon is currently still making 8-tracks and runs a mostly 8-track rock n roll record label.

Technology 
The player's head reads two of these tracks at a time, for stereo sound. After completing a program, the head mechanically switches to another set of two tracks, creating a characteristic clicking noise.

History

Development of tape cartridges 

Inventor George Eash invented a design in 1953, called the Fidelipac cartridge, also called the NAB cartridge.

Introduction of Stereo 8 

The Lear Jet Stereo 8 cartridge was designed by Richard Kraus while working for the Lear Jet Corporation, under Bill Lear, in 1963. The major change was to incorporate a neoprene rubber and nylon pinch roller into the cartridge itself, rather than to make the pinch roller a part of the tape player, reducing mechanical complexity. Lear also eliminated some of the internal parts of the Eash cartridge, such as the tape-tensioning mechanism and an interlock that prevented tape slippage. Because the Stereo-Pak cartridges were prone to jamming due to their complex design, Lear endeavored to redesign them, putting twice the number of tracks on them, doubling their recording time to 80 minutes.

Commercial success 

The popularity of both four-track and eight-track cartridges grew from the booming automobile industry. In September 1965, the Ford Motor Company introduced factory-installed and dealer-installed eight-track tape players as an option on three of its 1966 models (the sporty Mustang, luxurious Thunderbird, and high-end Lincoln), and RCA Victor introduced 175 Stereo-8 Cartridges from its RCA Victor and RCA Camden labels of recording artists catalogs. By the 1967 model year, all of Ford's vehicles offered this tape player upgrade option. Most of the initial factory installations were separate players from the radio (such as shown in the image), but dashboard mounted 8-track units were offered in combination with an AM radio, as well as with AM/FM receivers. 

The 8-track format gained steadily in popularity because of its convenience and portability. Home players were introduced in 1966 that allowed consumers to share tapes between their homes and portable systems. By the late 1960s, the 8-track segment was the largest in the consumer electronics market and the popularity of 8-track systems for cars helped generate demand for home units. "Boombox" type portable players were also popular but eight-track player/recorders failed to gain wide popularity and few manufacturers offered them except for manufacturer Tandy Corporation (for its Radio Shack electronics stores). With the availability of cartridge systems for the home, consumers started thinking of eight-tracks as a viable alternative to 33 rpm album style vinyl records, not only as a convenience for the car. Also by the late 1960s, prerecorded releases on the 8-track tape format began to arrive within a month of the vinyl release. The 8-track format became by far the most popular and offered the largest music library of all the tape systems.

Early karaoke machines 
Daisuke Inoue invented the first karaoke machine in 1971 called the Juke-8.

Other use 
Milton Bradley's (MB) OMNI Entertainment System was an electronic quiz machine game first released in 1980, similar to Jeopardy! or later entries in the You Don't Know Jack video game series, using 8-track tapes for questions, instructions, and answers, using audio playback as well as digital signals in magnetic tape data storage on remaining tracks to load the right answer for counting the score. In 1978, the Mego Corporation launched the 2-XL toy robot, which utilized the tracks for determining right from wrong answers. In 1977, the Scottish company GR International released the Bandmaster Powerhouse, a drum machine that played back custom-made 8-track cartridges containing drum and percussion rhythm loops recorded with real instruments. These could be subjected to a degree of processing using the drum machine's controls, which included tempo and instrument balance.

Decline
1978 was the peak year for 8-track sales in the United States, with sales declining quite rapidly from then on. Eight-track players became less common in homes and vehicles in the late 1970s. The compact cassette had arrived in 1963. 

In the U.S., eight-track cartridges were phased out of retail stores in late 1982 and early 1983. However, some titles were still available as eight-track tapes through Columbia House and RCA (BMG) Music Service Record Clubs until late 1988. Until 1990, Radio Shack (Tandy Corporation) continued to sell blank eight-track cartridges and players for home recording use under its Realistic brand.

See also 
 Album era
 Timeline of audio formats
 Sound recording and reproduction
 Birotron

References

External links 

 "A Survey of Recordable Magnetic Media" by Andrew D. Crews, December, 2003, University of Texas, accessed 8 August 2006
 So Wrong They're Right - A 1995 documentary about 8-track enthusiasts
 8-Track Heaven
 8-Track Moments Listen to the sound of the 8-Track click
 Bill Lear Invents the 8-Track and Brings in Ford, Motorola, and RCA Victor. Recording History.org

Audiovisual introductions in 1964
Audio storage
Tape recording
Discontinued media formats
Quadraphonic sound
American inventions
1964 in music
1964 in technology
Products introduced in 1964
1970s fads and trends